The Sugar City Ratepayers Alliance (SCRA) was a Fijian political party that operated only on the municipal level, in the city of Lautoka.  It was founded early in 2005 with a view to contesting the municipal elections to the Lautoka City Council, scheduled for 22 October 2005.  It failed to win any seats, however, either in the main election, or in the special election on 12 November for four seats in the Simla ward, which had been postponed.

The party contested the election on an anti-corruption platform.  The Fiji Labour Party, which dominated the council, had recently suspended nine councillors - its entire council membership - in the wake of revelations that they had granted taxi bases to friends and colleagues.  The SCRA called for the same standards of accountability that are required of parliamentarians to be applicable to municipal councillors.

The SCRA welcomed the Labour Party's decision to suspend its councillors, but claimed that the move did not go far enough.  Alliance chairman Faaiaz Ali said that the same rules that required members of Parliament suspended from their parties to resign should be applied to local government office holders, as with no party to answer to, they could be an even greater threat to ratepayers. "Now these councillors who have been suspended can do anything they want and they will definitely do everything they please because their term will expire in October," Ali said.  He called for the Local Government Act to be amended to allow for their dismissal.

On 11 October, Ali announced that the Alliance would contest 9 of the 16 seats on the council.  The party has nominated three candidates for each of the Waiyavi, Tavakubu and Veitari wards (multi-member constituencies), but has  chosen not to contest the Simla Ward.  Ali gave no reason for the decision to leave Simla uncontested, but said that the party was confident of winning most, if not all, of the 9 seats it was contending for.  There is one woman among the six Indo-Fijians and three indigenous Fijians standing for the party.  Ali himself is standing for the Veitari ward.

The same day, Ali warned city residents not to vote for candidates who hold permanent residency status in other countries.  The Fijian constitution forbids dual citizenship, but permanent residency, which amounts to a kind of second-class in a number of other countries, is not covered by the ban.  Ali said that holding Permanent Residency in another country made it too easy for councillors to abscond rather than face up to allegations of misconduct of council business, and that voters should be wary of such candidates.

Considerable publicity for the Alliance failed to break the hold of the Fiji Labour Party (FLP) on the City Council, however.  The FLP ended up with 12 seats and the Soqosoqo Duavata ni Lewenivanua (SDL) 4.

Some time after the military coup of 2006, the SCRA was effectively dissolved.

Sugar City Ratepayers Alliance
Political parties established in 2005
Political parties disestablished in 2006